Rudolf Steiner I (20 October 1903 – 24 January 1994) was a Romanian football midfielder.

International career
Rudolf Steiner played five friendly games for Romania. He and his brother Adalbert made their debut together in a 3–1 away victory against Turkey in 1926.

Personal life
His father, Karl Steiner was an engineer that was born in Bohemia who settled in Timișoara where he got married and had eight children. One of Rudolf's brothers, Adalbert Steiner was also a footballer, they played together at Chinezul Timișoara and Romania's national team.

Honours
Chinezul Timișoara
Divizia A: 1926–27

Notes

References

1903 births
1994 deaths
Romanian footballers
Romania international footballers
Association football midfielders
Liga I players
Sportspeople from Timișoara
Chinezul Timișoara players